Everybody is the second studio album by American country music artist Chris Janson. It was released on September 22, 2017 via Warner Bros. Records. It includes the singles "Fix a Drink" and "Drunk Girl".

Critical reception
Rating it 3.5 out of 5 stars, Stephen Thomas Erlewine of AllMusic wrote that "He delivers these (mostly) sweet songs with a grin and the hooks aren't pushed, they roll easy, and these two qualities turn Everybody into a sunny, appealing album."

Commercial performance
Everybody debuted at No. 7 on Billboards Top Country Albums, selling  8,000 copies in pure sales (11,000 units including streams and track sales). The album has sold 46,600 copies in the United States as of January 2019.

Track listing

Personnel
Adapted from Everybody liner notes.

Musicians
Roy Agee – trombone (7)
Brent Anderson – acoustic guitar (5), banjo (5), background vocals (5)
Joeie Canaday – bass guitar (11)
Jeff Coffin – saxophone (7)
Perry Coleman – background vocals (1, 3, 4, 6–10, 12)
Paul DiGiavonni – programming (3, 4, 6, 8, 10), electric guitar (3, 4, 6, 8, 10)
David Dorn – synthesizer (5), Hammond B-3 organ (5)
Lee Hendricks – bass guitar (2)
Steve Herrman – trumpet (7)
Jim Horn – saxophone (7)
Chris Janson – harmonica (7,11), lead vocals (all tracks)
Doug Kahan – bass guitar (7)
Troy Lancaster – electric guitar (7)
Tim Lauer – keyboards (7)
Tony Lucido – bass guitar (1, 3-6, 8-10, 12)
Rob McNelley – electric guitar (7)
Gordon Mote – keyboards (1, 9, 12), synthesized strings (1, 9, 12)
Justin Ostrander – electric guitar (1–6, 8, 12)
Russ Pahl – steel guitar (1, 3, 4, 6, 8–12)
Danny Parks – acoustic guitar (7)
Ben Phillips – drums (2, 5, 11), programming (2, 5)
Jeff Roach – keyboards (1–4, 6, 8–12), synthesizer (5), programming (5)
Jason Kyle Saetveit – background vocals (2, 11)
Adam Shoenfeld – electric guitar (3, 4, 6, 8, 10)
Ilya Toshinsky – acoustic guitar (1–4, 6, 8, 12), electric guitar (1, 9, 12), mandolin (2)
Craig Wiseman – acoustic guitar (7), electric guitar (7), banjo (7)
Nir Z – drums (1, 3, 4, 6–10, 12), percussion (1, 3, 4, 6, 8-10, 12), programming (1, 3, 4, 6, 8-10, 12)

Technical

All tracks except 2, 5, 7, 11
Jeff Balding – recording
Dave Cook – mixing assistant
Matt Coles – production assistant
Scott Hendricks – producer, recording, digital editing
Jeff Juliano – mixing
Brian David Willis – digital editing
Nir Z – digital editing

On "Everybody"
Chris Janson – producer
Justin Ostrander – recording
Ben Phillips – recording, digital editing, mixing
Jason Kyle Saetveit – recording

On "Fix a Drink"
Brent Anderson – producer
Jeff Balding – recording
Matt Coles – recording assistant
Chris DuBois – producer
Ben Phillips – recording, mixing, digital editing
Dan Shike – mastering
Lance "McGee" Van Dyke – recording assistant

On "Little Bit of Both"
Jeff Balding – recording
Dave Cook – mixing assistant
Jim Cooley – recording
Justin Francis – recording assistant
Scott Hendricks – producer, recording, digital editing
Jeff Juliano – mixing
Craig Wiseman – producer
Brian David Willis – digital editing

On "Redneck Life"
Dave Cook – mixing assistant
Scott Hendricks – producer, recording
Chris Janson – producer
Jeff Juliano – mixing
Ben Phillips – recording, digital editing
Jason Kyle Saetveit – recording, digital editing
Chris Utley – recording
Brian David Willis – digital editing

All tracks
Scott Johnson – production assistant
Andrew Mendelson – mastering

Charts

References

2017 albums
Chris Janson albums
Warner Records albums
Albums produced by Scott Hendricks